Bonnac may refer to the following communes in France:

 Bonnac, Ariège
 Bonnac, Cantal
 Bonnac-la-Côte